Lauren Kaye Scott (April 17, 1994June 9, 2021), known professionally as Dakota Skye, was an American pornographic actress who appeared in more than 300 adult videos from 2013 through 2019.

Personal life
Skye was born Lauren Kaye Scott on April 17, 1994, in Tampa or Clearwater, Florida.  Sexually abused as a child, Skye was first raised by her alcoholic mother and aspired to be a marine biologist.  In her early teens, she moved in with her father's family in southern Ohio.  Skye met Zachary Lecompte-Goble at a party in 2015, and after terminating a 2016 pregnancy, the two were married that year in Las Vegas, but soon separated before 2017.

In 2019, Skye's mother died of "addiction and alcoholism".  Sources close to Skye reported troubles in the final period of her private life.  The Toronto Sun reported that in 2020, two of Skye's grandparents died of COVID-19, she found herself homeless, and her pet dog died.  In spring 2021 it was revealed that Skye was working as an escort; that May she came under fire for a photo she posted to Instagram showing her flashing her breasts to the camera while standing in front of a George Floyd mural.

Substance abuse
According to Lecompte-Goble, it was when Skye lost an industry award in 2015 that her substance abuse dramatically increased.  Her Xanax habit jumped to 10–15 pills at a time, and she began smoking methamphetamine.  From 2017–2019, Skye entered drug rehabilitation at least six times, but only stayed for a few days each time.

As described by family, friends, and coworkers, Skye's behavior became erratic by the mid-2010s.  Fellow actress Kianna Bradley and Jacky St. James both described an impulsive and gregarious woman who "was never too proud to be silly."  Yet she would also "become paranoid and violent, accusing people of sexually abusing or harming her or claiming that shadowy forces were pursuing her and trying to end her life."  Her husband recalled times she threatened him with a knife, or when she flew to Paris "to make a sex tape with a stranger".  Skye would claim to be watched by hidden cameras, a target for assassination because of an affiliation with the Kennedy family, and a victim of rape by Ron Jeremy.

In her final days, Skye was still fighting years-long addictions to fentanyl and alcohol.

Criminal charges
In mid-2017, after she struck her boyfriend, musician Robert Anderson, in Pinellas Park, Florida, Skye was arrested and jailed by police on a charge of misdemeanor domestic battery.  Those charges were later dropped.  Skye pleaded guilty to driving under the influence in Burbank, California in 2019, and in 2020 she was jailed in Van Nuys for misdemeanor charges.

Career
Skye began working in pornography in 2013, performing under the names Dakota Skye or Kota Sky. Skye moved to Los Angeles after about 2.5 years to work for Mark Spiegler.

Prior to December 2018, she took time off from the industry to get sober and address her mental health.  She was "semi-active" in the field until 2020, working with Brazzers, Burning Angel, Digital Playground, Evil Angel, Girlfriends Films, Hustler Video, Jules Jordan Video, Kink.com, Naughty America, Reality Kings, and more.  Despite being in her mid-to-late 20s, Skye was still cast as a teen due to her "petite stature […] and omnipresent cherubic expression".  She appeared in over 300 pornographic videos.

She was nominated for AVN Best New Starlet award in 2015, and Favorite Female Performer award in 2018.  She also won "numerous porn industry awards, including Porn's Next It Girl, Best 'O' Face, and Best Boy/Girl Sex Scene."  She was one of Pornhub's most searched-for performers.

Death

During the evening of June 8, 2021, Skye told friends and coworkers that "the FBI and the Mafia were after her [and] she was going to go become a Hells Angel biker".  Everyone she called refused her a place to stay, so Skye walked from the San Fernando Valley to Los Angeles' Skid Row.  In the early hours of June 9, Skye asked to nap in a stranger's recreational vehicle; she was seen smoking something before lying on the man's couch. A short time later she was discovered deceased.

The next day, the Los Angeles County Department of Medical Examiner-Coroner confirmed Skye's identity and listed her as homeless, though Rolling Stone contradicted this and said she was living with her boyfriend in Woodland Hills.  Skye's husband identified the body.  An autopsy was conducted on June 10, but the release of cause and manner of death were awaiting "further investigation".  Rolling Stone reported that , Skye's cause of death had yet to be determined.  The coroner's office later categorized her death as accidental, caused solely by "acute multidrug intoxication".

See also

References

External links
 
 
 

1994 births
2021 deaths
21st-century American actresses
accidental deaths in California
American pornographic film actresses
drug-related deaths in California
people from the Tampa Bay area
pornographic film actors from Florida